The 1941 Northwestern Wildcats team was an American football team that represented Northwestern University as a member of the Big Ten Conference during the 1941 Big Ten Conference football season. In their seventh year under head coach Pappy Waldorf, the Wildcats compiled a 5–3 record (4–2 against conference opponents) and finished in fourth place in the Big Ten.

Four Northwestern players received honors on the 1941 All-Big Ten Conference football team: tackle Alf Bauman (AP-1; UP-1); end Bob Motl (AP-1; UP-2); halfback Otto Graham (AP-2); and guard George Zorich (UP-2).

Schedule

References

Northwestern
Northwestern Wildcats football seasons
Northwestern Wildcats football